Texananus is a genus of leafhoppers in the family Cicadellidae. There are at least 50 described species in Texananus.

Species
These 57 species belong to the genus Texananus:

 Texananus angus DeLong 1938 c g
 Texananus apicalis DeLong & Hershberger 1948 c g
 Texananus arctostaphylae Ball 1900 c g
 Texananus areolatus Baker, 1898 c g b (spotted Texan leafhopper)
 Texananus barbus DeLong 1944 c g
 Texananus biacus DeLong 1939 c g
 Texananus bialtus DeLong 1938 c g
 Texananus bilicium DeLong 1944 c g
 Texananus bullatus DeLong 1939 c g
 Texananus caducus DeLong, 1939 c g b
 Texananus cajaensis Linnavuori 1959 c g
 Texananus constrictus Crowder 1952 c g
 Texananus contaminatus Linnavuori 1959 c g
 Texananus cumulatus Ball 1900 c g
 Texananus curtus DeLong 1939 c g
 Texananus cuspidatus DeLong 1939 c g
 Texananus decorus (Osborn & Ball, 1897) c g b
 Texananus delicatus Osborn & Lathrop 1923 c g
 Texananus denticulus Osborn & Lathrop, 1923 c g b
 Texananus deversus DeLong & Hershberger 1949 c g
 Texananus dicentrus DeLong 1939 c g
 Texananus distinctus Lathrop 1917 c g
 Texananus dolus DeLong 1938 c g
 Texananus elongatus Ball 1918 c g
 Texananus excultus b
 Texananus extensus Crowder 1952 c g
 Texananus extremus Ball 1901 c g
 Texananus fumosus Crowder 1952 c g
 Texananus gladius DeLong 1938 c g
 Texananus graphicus Ball 1900 c g
 Texananus handlirschi Ball 1918 c g
 Texananus hosanus Ball 1918 c g
 Texananus lathropi Baker 1925 c g
 Texananus latipex DeLong, 1938 c g b
 Texananus longipennis Crowder, 1952 c g b
 Texananus lyratus DeLong & Hershberger 1948 c g
 Texananus majestus (Osborn & Ball, 1897) c g b
 Texananus marmor Sanders & DeLong 1923 c g
 Texananus mexicanus Ball 1918 c g
 Texananus monticolus DeLong 1943 c g
 Texananus oregonus Ball, 1931 c g b
 Texananus ovatus Van Duzee, 1892 c g b
 Texananus pergradus DeLong 1938 c g
 Texananus personatus Baker 1898 c g
 Texananus proximus Crowder 1952 c g
 Texananus rufusculus Osborn & Lathrop 1923 c g
 Texananus sabinus Sanders & DeLong 1920 c g
 Texananus serrellus DeLong 1944 c g
 Texananus sextus Crowder 1952 c g
 Texananus sonorus Ball 1936 c g
 Texananus spatulatus Van Duzee 1892 c g
 Texananus superbus Van Duzee 1892 c g
 Texananus ultratus DeLong 1943 c g
 Texananus uncinatus DeLong 1944 c g
 Texananus uncus DeLong 1944 c g
 Texananus validus Crowder 1952 c g
 Texananus vermiculatus DeLong 1938 c g

Data sources: i = ITIS, c = Catalogue of Life, g = GBIF, b = Bugguide.net

References

Further reading

External links

 

Phlepsiini
Cicadellidae genera